The 1999 Kansas City Wizards season was played at Arrowhead Stadium in Kansas City, Missouri. MLS did not allow matches to end in ties in 1999 and thus Shootouts were used to decide draws, the stats that follow do not include shootout goals scored and the teams actually point total in the regular season was 20 even though it is shown below as 24. Shootout win= 2 points, Shootout loss= 0 points. The Wizards first ever manager Ron Newman was let go and replaced with Bob Gansler.

Squad

Competitions

Major League Soccer

Squad statistics

Final Statistics

References

1999
Kansas City Wizards
Kansas City Wizards